Heteroxynematidae is a family of nematodes belonging to the order Rhabditida.

Genera
Genera:
 Cephaluris Akhtar, 1947
 Dentostomella Schulz & Krepkogorskaja, 1932
 Dermatopallarya Skrjabin, 1924
 Dermatoxys Schneider, 1866
 Eudromoxyura Anderson & Prestwood, 1972
 Fastigiuris Babaev, 1966
 Heteroxynema Hall, 1916
 Ivaschkinonema Erkulov, 1975
 Kahmannia Mas-Coma & Esteban, 1982
 Labiostomum Akhtar, 1941
 Lamotheoxyuris Falcón-Ordaz, Fernández & García-Prieto, 2010
 Paleoxyuris Hugot, Gardner, Borba, Araujo, Leles, Da-Rosa, Dutra, Ferreira & Araújo, 2014
 Rauschoxyuris Quentin, 1975
 Syphaciella Monnig, 1924

References

Nematodes